NPC (North Pacific Cable) is a submarine telecommunications cable system in the North Pacific Ocean linking the United States and Japan.

It has landing points in:
Miura, Kanagawa Prefecture, Japan
Pacific City, Tillamook County, Oregon, United States
Seward, Kenai Peninsula Borough, Alaska, United States (branch @ 420 Mbit/s)

It has a transmission capacity of 1,260 Mbit/s, and a total cable length of 5,200 miles (~8,400 km). The cable also included a spur to Alaska. The cable started operation in May 1991 and ceased operating in 2004.

References

External links 
 https://www.fcc.gov/document/north-pacific-cable-system

Submarine communications cables in the Pacific Ocean
Japan–United States relations
1991 establishments in Alaska
1991 establishments in Japan
1991 establishments in Oregon
2004 disestablishments in Alaska
2004 disestablishments in Japan
2004 disestablishments in Oregon